Ihalagammedda may refer to the following villages in Sri Lanka
Migammana Ihalagammedda 
Pallegama Ihalagammedda